The Serie B 1960–61 was the twenty-ninth tournament of this competition played in Italy since its creation.

Teams
Pro Patria, Prato and Foggia had been promoted from Serie C, while Palermo, Alessandria and Genoa had been relegated from Serie A.

Final classification

Results

Relegation tie-breaker
Played in Ferrara

Triestina relegated to Serie C.

References and sources
Almanacco Illustrato del Calcio - La Storia 1898-2004, Panini Edizioni, Modena, September 2005

Serie B seasons
2
Italy